Vida TV is a Venezuelan community television channel.  It was created in August 2003 and can be seen in the community of Ureña in the Pedro Maria Ureña Municipality of the Táchira State of Venezuela on UHF channel 51.  Fernando Londoño is the legal representative of the foundation that owns this channel.

As of now, Vida TV does not have a website.

See also
List of Venezuelan television channels

Television networks in Venezuela
Television stations in Venezuela
Mass media in Venezuela
2003 establishments in Venezuela
Television channels and stations established in 2003
Spanish-language television stations
Television in Venezuela